The Stuart Hotel in Stuart, Oklahoma is a hotel built in 1903.  It was listed on the National Register of Historic Places in 1982.

The hotel was built during 1901–03, a few years after the Choctaw, Oklahoma and Gulf Railroad came to town.  It served railway workers and drummers.  The hotel closed in 1968.  Furniture and fixtures remained intact in the building. 

The hotel was restored during 1989 to 1991, and converted into a bed-and-breakfast.

References

National Register of Historic Places in Hughes County, Oklahoma
Commercial buildings completed in 1903
Hughes County, Oklahoma
Hotels in Oklahoma